The empress cicada (Megapomponia imperatoria) is a species of cicada from Southeast Asia.

References

Invertebrates of Malaysia
Taxa named by John O. Westwood
Insects described in 1842
Dundubiini